Richard H. Price (born March 1, 1943) is an American physicist specializing in general relativity.

Price graduated from Stuyvesant High School in 1960, and went on to earn a dual degree in physics and engineering from Cornell University in 1965.  He earned his Ph.D. in 1971 from Caltech under the supervision of Kip Thorne.  He spent his career from 1971 to 2004 at the University of Utah, where he holds the title of Emeritus Professor.  In 2004 he joined the Center for Gravitational Wave Astronomy at the University of Texas at Brownsville. As of 2015 he became Senior Lecturer in physics at MIT. He is also on the adjunct faculty at the University of Massachusetts Dartmouth.

In 2017, Price became the editor of the American Journal of Physics.

Price is probably best known for a 1972 result now known as Price's theorem. This is usually informally stated as follows: any inhomogeneities in the spacetime geometry outside a black hole will be radiated away.  (Any such inhomogeneities can be quantified as nonzero higher multipole moments.)  Price's theorem explains how the no hair theorem is enforced.

Price also made pioneering numerical simulations which established (nonrigorously) a precise scenario for the emission of gravitational radiation during the merger of two compact objects (such as two black holes).  Subsequent work has largely confirmed the scenario which was first developed in his work.  These simulations have provided a major impetus for the development of gravitational wave detectors such as LIGO.

He has done much in development of pedagogical techniques in physics at the undergraduate, graduate, and postdoc levels; a significant portion at the University of Utah in Salt Lake City, Utah. He creates beautiful atlases of relativity. 

Price is the coauthor of three well known books in general relativity. 
He is a Fellow of the American Physical Society and the American Association for the Advancement of Science.

Books

References

External links

Richard Price home page at University of Utah, Retrieved 23 September 2017
Price's theorem from Eric Weisstein's World of Physics
Price's theorem at University of Illinois, Chicago Circle

1943 births
Living people
21st-century American physicists
Stuyvesant High School alumni
Cornell University College of Engineering alumni
University of Utah faculty
University of Texas at Brownsville faculty
Physics educators
Fellows of the American Association for the Advancement of Science
Fellows of the American Physical Society
Scientists from New York (state)